Tara Moore and Francesca Stephenson were the defending champions. Moore did not compete in 2012; Stephenson partnered up with Amanda Elliott, but lost in the semifinals.

Anna Fitzpatrick and Jade Windley won the title, defeating Karen Barbat and Lara Michel in the final, 6–2, 6–2.

Seeds

Draw

References 
 Draw

Aegon Pro-Series Loughborough - Women's Doubles
2012 Women's Doubles